Sainte-Marthe (French for Saint Martha) may refer to:

People

 Antoine André de Sainte-Marthe (1615–1679), French soldier, governor of Martinique
 Charles de Sainte-Marthe (1512–1555), French Protestant and theologian
 Scévole de Sainte-Marthe (1536–1623), French poet
 Scévole de Sainte-Marthe (1571–1650), French historian

Places

Canada 

 Sainte-Marthe, Quebec, in Montérégie region, Quebec
 Sainte-Marthe-de-Gaspé, a community in La Martre, Quebec
 Sainte-Marthe-du-Cap, former town in Quebec, now part of City of Trois-Rivières
 Sainte-Marthe-sur-le-Lac, in Laurentides, Quebec

France

Sainte-Marthe, Eure département
Sainte-Marthe, Lot-et-Garonne département

See also 
 Saint Martha (disambiguation)